Hemigrammus is a genus of freshwater fish in the family Characidae native to South America (including Trinidad) and commonly seen in the aquarium trade.

Species
There are currently 59 recognized species in this genus:
 Hemigrammus aereus Géry, 1959
 Hemigrammus aguaruna F. C. T. Lima, Corrêa & Ota, 2016 
 Hemigrammus analis Durbin, 1909
 Hemigrammus arua F. C. T. Lima, Wosiacki & C. S. Ramos, 2009
 Hemigrammus ataktos Marinho, D'Agosta & Birindelli, 2014 
 Hemigrammus barrigonae C. H. Eigenmann & Henn, 1914
 Hemigrammus bellottii (Steindachner, 1882)
 Hemigrammus bleheri Géry & Mahnert, 1986 (Fire-head tetra)
 Hemigrammus boesemani Géry, 1959
 Hemigrammus brevis Durbin, 1911
 Hemigrammus coeruleus Durbin, 1908
 Hemigrammus cupreus Durbin, 1918
 Hemigrammus cylindricus Durbin, 1909
 Hemigrammus diagonicus Mendonça & Wosiacki, 2011 
 Hemigrammus durbinae Ota, F. C. T. Lima & Pavanelli, 2015 
 Hemigrammus elegans (Steindachner, 1882)
 Hemigrammus erythrozonus Durbin, 1909 (Glowlight tetra)
 Hemigrammus falsus Meinken, 1958 
 Hemigrammus filamentosus Zarske, 2011 
 Hemigrammus geisleri Zarske & Géry, 2007
 Hemigrammus gracilis (Lütken, 1875)
 Hemigrammus guyanensis Géry, 1959
 Hemigrammus haraldi Géry, 1961
 Hemigrammus hyanuary Durbin, 1918 (Costello tetra)
 Hemigrammus iota Durbin, 1909
 Hemigrammus levis Durbin, 1908
 Hemigrammus luelingi Géry, 1964
 Hemigrammus lunatus Durbin, 1918 
 Hemigrammus machadoi Ota, F. C. T. Lima & Pavanelli, 2014 
 Hemigrammus mahnerti Uj & Géry, 1989
 Hemigrammus marginatus Durbin, 1911
 Hemigrammus matei C. H. Eigenmann, 1918
 Hemigrammus megaceps Fowler, 1945
 Hemigrammus melanochrous Fowler, 1913
 Hemigrammus micropterus Meek, 1907
 Hemigrammus microstomus Durbin, 1918
 Hemigrammus mimus J. E. Böhlke, 1955
 Hemigrammus neptunus Zarske & Géry, 2002
 Hemigrammus newboldi (Fernández-Yépez, 1949)
 Hemigrammus ocellifer (Steindachner, 1882)
 Hemigrammus ora Zarske, Le Bail & Géry, 2006
 Hemigrammus orthus Durbin, 1909
 Hemigrammus parana Marinho, F. R. de Carvalho, Langeani & Tatsumi, 2008
 Hemigrammus pretoensis Géry, 1965
 Hemigrammus pulcher Ladiges, 1938 (Garnet tetra)
 Hemigrammus rhodostomus C. G. E. Ahl, 1924 (Rummy-nose tetra)
 Hemigrammus rodwayi Durbin, 1909 (Gold tetra)
 Hemigrammus rubrostriatus Zarske, 2015 
 Hemigrammus schmardae (Steindachner, 1882) 
 Hemigrammus silimoni Britski & F. C. T. Lima, 2008
 Hemigrammus skolioplatus Bertaco & T. P. Carvalho, 2005
 Hemigrammus stictus (Durbin, 1909)
 Hemigrammus taphorni Benine & G. A. M. Lopes, 2007
 Hemigrammus tocantinsi F. R. de Carvalho, Bertaco & Jerep, 2010
 Hemigrammus tridens C. H. Eigenmann, 1907
 Hemigrammus ulreyi (Boulenger, 1895)
 Hemigrammus unilineatus (T. N. Gill, 1858) (Feather-fin tetra)
 Hemigrammus vorderwinkleri Géry, 1963
 Hemigrammus yinyang F. C. T. Lima & L. M. Sousa, 2009

References

Characidae
Freshwater fish genera
Characiformes genera
Taxa named by Theodore Gill